Celil Yüksel (born 1 January 1998) is a Turkish professional footballer who plays as a midfielder for Samsunspor.

Professional career
Celil signed his first professional contract with Galatasaray on 11 October 2017. Celil made his professional debut with Galatasaray in a 3-0 Süper Lig win over Kayserispor on 10 November 2018.

Honours
Galatasaray
 Süper Lig: 2018–19
 Turkish Cup: 2018–19

References

External links
 
 
 
 
 Galatasaray profile

1998 births
People from Havza
Living people
Turkish footballers
Turkey youth international footballers
Association football midfielders
Galatasaray S.K. footballers
Adanaspor footballers
Samsunspor footballers
Süper Lig players
TFF First League players